Shakill's II is an album by David Murray, released on the Japanese DIW label in 1994. It features performances by Murray's Quartet with Don Pullen on electronic organ.

The album is sequel to Murray's 1991 disc, Shakill's Warrior.

Critical reception

The Pittsburgh Post-Gazette deemed Shakill's II the 10th best jazz album of 1994.

Track listing
 "The Sixth Sense" (Frank Dean, Pullen) - 11:24
 "Blues Somewhere" (Morris) - 8:49
 "For Cynthia" (Will Connell Jr.) - 8:25
 "Shakill's II ...My Son Mingus in the Poconos" (Murray) - 11:11
 "Crazy Tales" (Bill White) - 6:52
 "One for the Don" (Pullen) - 8:15
 "1529 Gunn Street" (Pullen) - 6:52
 Recorded October 5 & 6, 1993

Personnel
David Murray - tenor saxophone
Don Pullen - organ
 Bill White - guitar
J.T. Lewis - drums

References 

David Murray (saxophonist) albums
1994 albums
DIW Records albums